Dick Tracy is an American TV series based on the detective comic strip Dick Tracy. The show aired on ABC from September 11, 1950 to April 7, 1951. It starred Ralph Byrd.

An animated series, The Dick Tracy Show, aired in syndication in 1961.

Plot

Cast
The cast included:
 Ralph Byrd as Dick Tracy
 Joe Devlin as Sam Catchem
 Angela Greene as Tess Trueheart
 Dick Elliott as Officer Murphy
 Pierre Watkin as Police Chief Pat Patton
 Thurston Hall as Diet Smith
 Florence Bates as Miss Frothingham
 Lyle Talbot as the Brain
 Jo-Carroll Dennison as Breathless Mahoney

Production
It was shot at the Sam Goldwyn Studios in Los Angeles.

Byrd died in August 1952.

References

External links
Dick Tracy at IMDb

1950 American television series debuts
1951 American television series endings
1950s American crime television series
American Broadcasting Company original programming
Dick Tracy
Television shows filmed in Los Angeles
Television shows based on comic strips